Karanbash (Qaranbaş) is a rural locality (a village) in Sergiopolsky Selsoviet, Davlekanovsky District, Bashkortostan, Russia. The population was 185 as of 2010. There are 2 streets.

Geography 
Karanbash is located 11 km southwest of Davlekanovo (the district's administrative centre) by road. Sergiopol is the nearest rural locality.

References 

Rural localities in Davlekanovsky District